Coral Springs is a residential neighbourhood in the northeast quadrant of Calgary, Alberta. It is located at the eastern edge of the city and is bounded by 64 Avenue N to the north, McKnight Boulevard to the south, 68 Street E to the west and 84 Street E and the Rocky View County to the east.

Coral Springs is a new community, established in 1991. It was built with an architectural style and layout that emphasizes its Californian theme, with a lake at the center of the neighbourhood. It is represented in the Calgary City Council by the Ward 5 councillor.

Demographics

Residents in this community had a median household income of $83,067 in 2000, and there were 10.4% low income residents living in the neighbourhood. As of 2000, 45.3% of the residents were immigrants. All buildings were single-family detached homes, and only 2.7% of the housing was used for renting. It is currently the wealthiest community in NE Calgary, and home to a significant Ismaili and Sikh population.

See also
List of neighbourhoods in Calgary

References

External links
Coral Springs Community Association
Coral Springs Community Association

Neighbourhoods in Calgary